Killing Hasselhoff is a 2017 American action comedy film directed by Darren Grant, and starring Ken Jeong and David Hasselhoff. The film was released on DVD and digital platforms on August 29, 2017.

Plot
A man, who is down on his luck, attempts to win a celebrity death pool by trying to kill David Hasselhoff.  The prize is half a million dollars, which he can use to pay off a loan shark and get his life back on track.

Cast

Production
Writer Peter Hoare was unhappy with the way the script was rewritten during production. He told Script Magazine, “Little by little, what I saw was the movie changed into something that was so different than the movie I originally wrote, and that David read, so many years before. Long story short, it came out on DVD, but man, it could have been really, really funny.”

References

External links
 

American action comedy films
WWE Studios films
2017 films
Films directed by Darren Grant
David Hasselhoff
2017 action comedy films
2010s English-language films
2010s American films